Tregonning may refer to:

People 
Don Tregonning, Australian professional tennis player and coach

Places 
Tregonning (hamlet), Cornwall, England, United Kingdom
Tregonning Hill, Cornwall, England, United Kingdom

See also
Tregoning